Wales is obliged by law to maintain lists of species and habitats of principal importance for biodiversity conservation; the other countries within the UK: Scotland, England and Northern Ireland, have their own laws for this purpose.

Public bodies, including local authorities now have a legal duty to have regard to conserving biodiversity in the exercise of their normal functions. In Wales, that obligation originally derived from section 42 of the Natural Environment and Rural Communities (NERC) Act 2006. However, this requirement for Wales has since been superseded by an almost identical requirement enshrined within the Environment (Wales) Act 2016.

Selection
The habitats that have been designated to be of "principal importance for the purpose of conserving biodiversity" derive from lists originally drawn up for the UK Biodiversity Action Plan (UK BAP). These lists were reviewed in 2007, and the total number of UK BAP habitats increased from 45 to 65, and the number of UK BAP species increased from under 600 to 1,150.

From these, the formal list just for Wales (and laid out below) now contains 53 of those 65 habitats.

Legal obligations
Section 6 of the Environment (Wales) Act 2016 places a legal obligation on public bodies in Wales to 'maintain and enhance biodiversity' whilst carrying out their functions. Section 7 of that Act requires Welsh Ministers to publish and maintain lists of species and types of habitats in Wales that are regarded as of 'principal importance' for the purpose of maintaining and enhancing that biodiversity. This section of the Act replaces the biodiversity duty originally outlined in Section 42 of the NERC Act 2006 for both England and Wales.

Significance
Awareness of the presence of any priority habitat or priority species identified on these lists is of importance within the local authority planning process when land is considered for development. Along with legally protected species, as well as statutory and non-statutory sites, knowledge of the presence of priority habitats and priority species is required if the impact of future development is to be avoided or mitigated.  Planning Policy Wales indicates that, when determining planning applications, the existence of priority habitats are of greater status than others. By fully considering all these features in the decision-making process, a planning authority will have demonstrated that it has discharged its duty to conserve biodiversity.

Habitats of 'principal importance' in Wales
The list shows the broad habitat group, followed by name of the habitat of 'principal importance'.

Terrestrial, coastal & freshwater habitats

Arable and horticultural: Arable field margins 
Bogs: Blanket bog
Bogs: Lowland raised bog 
Fen, marsh and swamp: Lowland fens 
Fen, marsh and swamp: Purple moor grass and rush pastures 
Fen, marsh and swamp: Reedbeds 
Fen, marsh and swamp: Upland flushes, fens and swamps 
Grassland (acid): Lowland dry acid grassland 
Grassland (calcareous): Lowland calcareous grassland 
Grassland (calcareous): Upland calcareous grassland 
Grassland (improved): Coastal and floodplain grazing marsh 
Grassland (neutral): Lowland meadows 
Heath: Lowland heathland
Heath: Upland heathland 
Inland rock: Calaminarian grasslands 
Inland rock: Inland rock outcrop and scree habitats 
Inland rock: Limestone pavement 
Inland rock: Open mosaic habitats on previously developed land 
Montane habitats: Mountain heaths and willow scrub 
Rivers and streams: Rivers 
Standing open waters/canals: Aquifer-fed naturally fluctuating water bodies 
Standing open waters/canals: Eutrophic standing waters 
Standing open waters/canals: Mesotrophic lakes 
Standing open waters/canals: Oligotrophic and dystrophic lakes 
Standing open waters/canals: Ponds 
Supralittoral rock: Maritime cliff and slopes 
Supralittoral sediment: Coastal sand dunes 
Supralittoral sediment: Coastal vegetated shingle 
Woodland: Traditional orchards 
Woodland: Wood pasture & parkland 
Woodland: Hedgerows 
Woodland: Lowland beech and yew woodland 
Woodland: Lowland mixed deciduous woodland 
Woodland: Upland mixed ash woodland 
Woodland: Upland oak woodland 
Woodland: Wet woodland

Marine habitats
Littoral rock: Estuarine rocky habitats 
Littoral rock: Intertidal boulder communities 
Littoral rock: Sabellaria alveolata reefs 
Littoral sediment: Coastal saltmarsh 
Littoral sediment: Intertidal mudflats 
Littoral sediment: Peat and clay exposures 
Littoral sediment: Seagrass beds 
Littoral sediment: Sheltered muddy gravels 
Sublittoral rock: Carbonate reefs 
Sublittoral rock: Fragile sponge & anthozoan communities on subtidal rocky habitats
Sublittoral rock: Tidal swept channels 
Sublittoral sediment: Blue mussel beds
Sublittoral sediment: Horse mussel beds
Sublittoral sediment: Mixed muddy sediments
Sublittoral sediment: Mud habitats in deep water 
Sublittoral sediment: Musculus discors beds 
Sublittoral sediment: Subtidal sands and gravels

See also
List of species and habitats of principal importance in England

References

'
'
'
'
Biology-related lists
Nature-related lists
United Kingdom environment-related lists
United Kingdom nature-related lists
'
'
'
'
Wales-related lists